George Walter Anderson (25 May 1891 – 1959) was an English footballer who played as a forward. Born in Cheetham, Manchester, he began his career with local clubs Broughton St. James', Broughton Wellington and Salford United, before joining Bury in 1910. A year later, he was signed by Manchester United. Anderson went on to score 39 goals for United, and scored another 39 unofficial goals during the First World War.

Anderson was involved in a match-fixing scandal that ended his career. In a game against Burnley at Old Trafford on 29 December 1917, he was accused of fixing the match after three United players complained to the team president. He was banned from Old Trafford on 8 January 1918 and later sentenced to eight months in prison after a trial in Liverpool. Anderson had already testified during the investigation of the 1915 British football betting scandal, which led to the banning of seven Manchester United and Liverpool players.

He is buried in Blackley Cemetery.

References

External links
Profile StretfordEnd.co.uk profile
Profile at MUFCInfo.com

1891 births
1959 deaths
Footballers from Manchester
People from Cheetham Hill
English footballers
Association football forwards
Salford United F.C. players
Manchester United F.C. players
Bury F.C. players
English Football League players